Računalniške novice is a Slovenian computer magazine.

Profile
Računalniške novice was established in 1996. It is issued biweekly. The owner and publisher is STROMBOLI, marketing, d.o.o.

It sells computer hardware, software, and microchips from around the world as well as video games and game equipment.

See also
 List of magazines in Slovenia

References

External links
 Official website

Biweekly magazines
Magazines established in 1996
Mass media in Ljubljana
Computer magazines published in Slovenia
Slovene-language magazines